Iliyan Chavdarov (born 4 May 1991)  is a Bulgarian footballer who plays as a forward for Marek 1919.

Career 
In 2009, Chavdarov was included in the Velbazhd Kyustendil first-team squad. During his two years at Velbazhd, he scored 10 goals in the South-West V AFG.

On 20 July 2011, Chavdarov joined Kaliakra Kavarna in co-ownership deal. Kaliakra acquired 75% of Chavdarov's transfer rights. He made his debut in a 1–0 league loss against Chernomorets Burgas on 6 August, coming on as a substitute for Georgi Kichukov.

Chavdarov spent the 2016–17 season at Marek Dupnitsa but left the club at the end of the campaign. In August 2017, he joined Bansko.

Career statistics

References

External links 
 
 

Living people
1991 births
Bulgarian footballers
Association football forwards
PFC Velbazhd Kyustendil players
PFC Kaliakra Kavarna players
FC Pirin Razlog players
PFC Dobrudzha Dobrich players
PFC Marek Dupnitsa players
FC Bansko players
First Professional Football League (Bulgaria) players
Second Professional Football League (Bulgaria) players